Pylargosceles is a genus of moths in the family Geometridae. The species are main distributed in Eastern Asia, such as Korea, Japan, Taiwan, and regions of southeast China.

Species
 P. limbaria Wileman, 1915
 P. steganioides Butler, 1878

References

Sterrhinae